Erigeron pulchellus, the Robin's plantain, blue spring daisy or hairy fleabane, is a North American species of plants in the family Asteraceae. It is widespread across much of the United States and Canada from Québec and Ontario south as far as eastern Texas and the Florida Panhandle.

Erigeron pulchellus is a perennial herb up to 60 cm (2 feet) tall, spreading by means of underground rhizomes. It produces 1-9 flower heads per stem, each head containing sometimes as many as 100 white, pink, pale blue, or pale purple ray florets surrounding many yellow disc florets. The species grows in forests, roadsides, and the banks of bodies of water.

Varieties
Erigeron pulchellus var. brauniae Fernald - Kentucky, Ohio, West Virginia
Erigeron pulchellus var. pulchellus - most of species range
Erigeron pulchellus var. tolsteadii Cronquist - Minnesota

References

External links
Erigeron pulchellus United States Department of Agriculture plants profile

pulchellus
Flora of North America
Plants described in 1803